Protein phosphatase 1 regulatory subunit 7 is an enzyme that in humans is encoded by the PPP1R7 gene.

References

Further reading